The Black Reel Award for Television for Outstanding Directing, Comedy Series is an annual award presented to the best directing of a television comedy series for a particular episode.

2010s

2020s

Programs with multiple awards

2 awards
 black-ish (consecutive)

Programs with multiple nominations

9 nominations 
 black-ish

5 nominations
 Insecure

3 nominations
 Atlanta

2 nominations
 BlackAF

Total awards by network
 ABC – 2
 HBO - 1
 HULU - 1
 Netflix - 1

Individuals with multiple awards

Individuals with multiple nominations

3 nominations 
 Donald Glover

2 nominations 
 Kenya Barris
 Regina King
 Melina Matsoukas

References

Black Reel Awards